Kayan is a village in the Ijevan Municipality of the Tavush Province of Armenia. It belongs to the community of Aygehovit.

References

External links 

Populated places in Tavush Province